Mary Elizabeth Dawson, née Elizabeth Buzby and better known as Mademoiselle Fifi (February 7, 1890 – July 21, 1982), was a dancer whose onstage performance at Winter Garden Theatre on the night of April 20, 1925 was memorialized in The Night They Raided Minsky's.

Early life 
A Philadelphia native, her given name was Mary Dawson. Her mother was a devout Catholic and her father was a Quaker who worked as a policeman.

Performances 
On the evening of April 20, Mademoiselle Fifi wore a skintight black net from her toe tips to her bra. As the orchestra played a medley of Puccini, ragtime music, and Gaite' Parisienne by Offenbach, she pulled one of her straps from her shoulder and then removed her bra. Mademoiselle Fifi concluded her strip act that evening bare chested. She was later arrested by John Sumner, the secretary of the New York Society for the Suppression of Vice under the action of public obscenity. Fond of classic subjects, Mademoiselle Fifi performed The Dance of the September Morn. She is also known for performing an oriental shimmy with a live garter snake.

References

Artists from Philadelphia
American burlesque performers
American female dancers
1890 births
1982 deaths
20th-century American dancers
20th-century American women